Jinošov is a municipality and village in Třebíč District in the Vysočina Region of the Czech Republic. It has about 200 inhabitants.

History
The first written mention of Jinošov is from 1349.

References

Villages in Třebíč District